Sheikhanwala  is a village in Kapurthala district of Punjab State, India. The village is administrated by a Sarpanch who is an elected representative of village as per the constitution of India and Panchayati raj (India).

Demography 
According to the report published by Census India in 2011, Sheikhanwala has 77 houses with total population of 399 persons of which 210 are male and 189 females. Literacy rate of Sheikhanwala is 75.35%, lower than the state average of 75.84%.  The population of children in the age group 0–6 years is 46 which is 11.53% of total population. Child sex ratio is approximately 1091, higher than the state average of 846.

Population data

References

External links
  Villages in Kapurthala
 Kapurthala Villages List

Villages in Kapurthala district